Chandon is a commune in the Loire department, France.

Chandon may also refer to:

Chandon (Fribourg), a former commune in the canton of Fribourg, Switzerland
Chandon Sullivan (born 1996), American football player
Domaine Chandon California, an American winery
Moët et Chandon, a French winery